Goo or GOO may refer to:

Arts and media
 Goo (album), by the band Sonic Youth
 Goo (Gumby character), a character on The Gumby Show
 Goo (Foster's Home for Imaginary Friends), character on Foster's Home for Imaginary Friends
 Great Old One, in the work of H. P. Lovecraft
 Guardians of Order, a defunct Canadian producer of role-playing games
 Milton "Goo" Berry, a character on the television show My Brother and Me

People

Given name
 Goo Arlooktoo (1963–2002), Canadian politician and cabinet minister
 Goo Kennedy (1949–2020), American professional basketball player

Surname
 Ah Chew Goo (1918–2015), American basketball player and coach
 Goo Hara (1991–2019), South Korean singer and actress
 Goo Hye Sun (born 1984), South Korean actress
 Goo Kim Fui (1835–1908), Chinese merchant, community leader and philanthropist

Science and technology
 goo (search engine), an Internet search engine and web portal based in Japan
 Gaspergou, a North American fish also known as goo fish
 Gastric outlet obstruction, a medical condition where the outflow of the stomach is blocked

Transportation infrastructure
 Goole railway station (National Rail station code GOO), England
 Goondiwindi Airport (IATA code), Australia

Other uses
 Goo language, from Ivory Coast
 Gone Dau language (ISO 639 code), of eastern Fiji
 Guarantee of origin (GoO), an instrument defined in European legislation
 Flubber (material), a sticky ooze-like goo

See also
 Gray goo, a hypothetical end-of-the-world scenario involving molecular nanotechnology
 Gu (disambiguation)
 Goo goo (disambiguation)